Jaime Castrillón (born 5 April 1983) is a Colombian former footballer who last played for the Orlando SeaWolves in the Major Arena Soccer League.

Club career
Castrillón began his career with top Colombian side Independiente Medellín in 2002. As one of the top midfielders in Colombia he helped Medellín in capturing the Colombian Primera A title in 2002 and 2004. He appeared in almost 300 appearances with "El Poderoso de la Montaña" in his eight years with Medellín. In 2009, he left Colombia and joined Chinese club Nanchang Bayi, remaining at the club for one year. In 2010, he returned to Colombia, this time as the star signing for Once Caldas ahead of its participation in the 2010 Copa Libertadores, and was once again a key figure in helping his new club capture a Colombian Primera A title. In 2011, he returned to Independiente and had a fine season scoring 11 goals for the club.

Castrillón signed with Major League Soccer club Colorado Rapids on January 25, 2012. On 4 December 2013, the Colorado Rapids announced that Castrillón would not return for the 2014 season.

On 18 November 2014, Castrillón signed with NASL club Jacksonville Armada for their inaugural 2015 season. He was released in December 2015.

In 2016 Castrillón joined Atlético Bucaramanga.

Castrillón signed with the Orlando SeaWolves of the Major Arena Soccer League in January 2020.

International career
Castrillón made his debut for Colombia in 2004. He has been a prominent member of the national squad appearing in 27 games for his nation. He played in Copa América 2004 and Copa América 2007 scoring in the 2007 tournament. Also in the Colombia national team he scored 4 goals.

International goals
Scores and results list Colombia's goal tally first.

Honors
 Champions Colombian Primera A, 2002 and 2004 Independiente Medellín
 Champions Colombian Primera A, 2010 Once Caldas
 Champions Colombian C division, 2001 Independiente Medellín
 3rd Place finish at 2003 FIFA World Youth Championship
 4th-place finish with Colombia Senior team at Copa America 2003 Peru

References

External links

1983 births
Living people
Colombian footballers
Colombia international footballers
Colombia under-20 international footballers
Colombian expatriate footballers
Independiente Medellín footballers
Once Caldas footballers
Colorado Rapids players
Jacksonville Armada FC players
2004 Copa América players
2005 CONCACAF Gold Cup players
2007 Copa América players
Expatriate footballers in China
Shanghai Shenxin F.C. players
China League One players
Colombian expatriate sportspeople in China
Expatriate soccer players in the United States
Categoría Primera A players
Major League Soccer players
North American Soccer League players
Colombian expatriate sportspeople in the United States
Sportspeople from Antioquia Department
Association football midfielders
Atlético Bucaramanga footballers
Orlando SeaWolves players